Eva Rösken (also spelled Roesken, born 5 July 1984) is a German sports shooter. She competed in the women's 50 metre rifle three positions event at the 2016 Summer Olympics.

References

External links
 

1984 births
Living people
German female sport shooters
Olympic shooters of Germany
Shooters at the 2016 Summer Olympics
People from Eberbach (Baden)
Sportspeople from Karlsruhe (region)
ISSF rifle shooters
21st-century German women